The Sierra Azul is a mountain range in Santa Clara County, California. It is the southern half of the Santa Cruz Mountains range, which is divided into two parts by California Highway 17 into what the colonizing Spanish called the Sierra Morena or "Brown Mountains" to the north and the Sierra Azul or "Blue Mountains" to the south. Part of the range is within the Sierra Azul Open Space Preserve.

The highest peak is Mount Umunhum, the site of the former Almaden Air Force Station radar site and the current location of a NEXRAD weather radar of the National Weather Service which serves the San Francisco Bay Area and Monterey Bay Area.

References

External links 
 Sierra Azul Open Space Preserve website — part of the Midpeninsula Regional Open Space District system.

Santa Cruz Mountains
Mountain ranges of Santa Clara County, California
Mountain ranges of the San Francisco Bay Area
Mountain ranges of Northern California